USS Wabash was a steam screw frigate of the United States Navy that served during the American Civil War. Post-war she continued to serve her country in European operations and eventually served as a barracks ship in Boston, Massachusetts, and was sold in 1912.

Pre-Civil War service
Wabash—the first U.S. Navy ship to bear that name—was laid down on May 16, 1854 by the Philadelphia Navy Yard; launched on October 24, 1855, sponsored by Miss Pennsylvania Grice; and commissioned there on August 18, 1856, Captain Frederick K. Engle in command.

Wabash departed Philadelphia, Pennsylvania on September 7, 1856, stopping at Portsmouth, New Hampshire, to embark President Franklin Pierce for passage to Annapolis, Maryland. She arrived at New York on October 23, 1856, sailing on November 28, 1856 to become flagship of Commodore Hiram Paulding's Home Squadron. The squadron was instrumental in foiling the expedition against Nicaragua underway by American filibuster, William Walker, who had dreamed of uniting the nations of Central America into a vast military empire led by himself. Through insurrection, he became president of Nicaragua in 1855 only to have Cornelius Vanderbilt—who controlled the country's shipping lifelines—shut off supplies and aid. A revolt toppled Walker from power, and he was trying for a military comeback before he was captured in 1857 by the Home Squadron. Stateside controversy over the questionable legality of seizing American nationals in foreign, neutral lands prompted President James Buchanan to relieve Commodore Paulding of his command. Wabash was decommissioned on March 1, 1858 at the New York Navy Yard.

First recommissioning, 1858–1859
Wabash was recommissioned on May 25, 1858, Captain Samuel Barron in command, and became the flagship of Commodore Elie A. F. La Vallette's Mediterranean Squadron. The future naval hero of the Battle of Manila Bay during the Spanish–American War, George Dewey—then a midshipman—served aboard the Wabash when she touched at her first port of call, Gibraltar, on August 17, 1858. Dewey would later write in his autobiography that "The Wabash was quite the finest ship of the foreign fleet and also the largest." In April 1859, Wabash ran aground at Livorno, Grand Duchy of Tuscany. She was refloated with the assistance of a British steamship having had her cannon taken off. Wabash returned to the New York Navy Yard on December 16, 1859 and decommissioned there on December 20, 1859.

Civil War service, 1861–1865

Early war
With the outbreak of the American Civil War, Wabash was recommissioned on May 16, 1861, Captain Samuel Mercer in command and Thomas G. Corbin (descended from a prominent Virginia family but also a career naval office loyal to the Union) as his executive officer. The Wabash departed New York on May 30, 1861 as flagship of the Atlantic Blockading Squadron under Rear Admiral Silas H. Stringham.

By this date, she had also captured the brigantines Hannah, Balch, and Solferino, along with 22 Confederate prisoners from the four vessels.

On August 26, 1861, Wabash departed Hampton Roads, bound for Hatteras Inlet, North Carolina, to take part in the first combined amphibious assault of the war. Union forces secured Hatteras Inlet with the capture of Forts Hatteras and Clark on August 29, 1861. The attacking force suffered no casualties and took over 700 prisoners. Among these was Captain Samuel Barron of the Confederate Navy, who before his resignation from the United States Navy served on the Wabash under Rear Admiral La Vallette.

South Atlantic Blockading Squadron
Wabash was later designated the flagship of Flag Officer Samuel Francis du Pont, the new commander of the South Atlantic Blockading Squadron, and was sent to the New York Navy Yard for repairs on September 21, 1861.

After refit, Wabash departed Fort Monroe on 29 October 1861 to spearhead the Federal assault on Port Royal, South Carolina. The assembled invasion fleet was the largest yet organized by the Navy, containing 77 vessels and 16,000 Army troops under Brigadier General Thomas W. Sherman. The combined force secured Port Royal Sound on 7 November 1861 after a furious four-hour battle. Wabash led the battle line in this major strategic Union victory. Executive Officer Corbin remained with the Wabash following Captain Mercer's retirement, and was promoted to Commander in July 1862, only leaving when assigned as Commandant of Midshipmen at the U.S. Naval Academy in 1863 (and in 1864 assuming command of the steamer USS Augusta and becoming commander of the West India Squadron enforcing the blockade).

Meanwhile, Wabash now took up permanent station on the Charleston blockade, operating out of Port Royal. On March 11, 1862, a landing party led by ship's commanding officer, Commander C. R. P. Rodgers, occupied St. Augustine, Florida. A detachment of seamen and officers from Wabash landed and manned a battery which bombarded Fort Pulaski, Georgia, on April 10 and April 11, 1862 and was instrumental in forcing that Southern fort to surrender. A naval battery of three 12 pounder howitzers from Wabash supported Union troops at the Battle of Pocotaligo, on October 22, 1862.

[[File:USS Wabash, last gun from Fort Sumter, photo-type by Gutekunst of painting by A.C. Stewart (18037541325).jpg|right|thumb|Wabash at Fort Sumter]]
Confederate vessels twice harassed Wabash while on duty in Port Royal Sound. On August 5, 1863, a small steamer on picket duty below Fort Sumter, fired upon and ran down a launch from Wabash, capturing 10 sailors and drowning two. The  submarine torpedo boat also attacked Wabash on April 18, 1864. Ensign Charles H. Craven, officer of the deck, spotted the cigar-shaped vessel in time for Wabash to get underway. The David disengaged from the attack in the face of musket fire and round shot discharged from Wabash.

North Atlantic Blockading SquadronWabash departed her station on 1 October, bound for the Norfolk Navy Yard and an overhaul. En route, she grounded briefly on Frying Pan Shoals, suffering minor damage to her rudder. Repairs and overhaul were completed by 16 December, in time for Wabash to join the North Atlantic Blockading Squadron and to participate in the first attack on Fort Fisher, North Carolina, on December 24 and December 25, 1864. The failure of this initial attempt to take the fort necessitated a second, successful combined operation between January 13 and January 15, 1865. It was during this second attack on Fort Fisher, that corporal Andrew J. Tomlin and ordinary seamen Louis C. Shepard earned the Medal of Honor.Wabash returned to Hampton Roads on January 17, 1865, receiving orders on January 25, 1865 to proceed to the Boston Navy Yard. Wabash was decommissioned at Boston on February 14, 1865.

Prizes

Officers during Fort Fisher siege
 Captain, Melancton Smith
 Lieutenant Commander, C. H. Cushman.
 Lieutenants, Ellicot C. V. Blake, H. C. Tallman
 Surgeon, H. F. McSherry.
 Passed Assistant Surgeon, James H. Tinkham.
 Acting Assistant Surgeon, N. L. Campbell.
 Paymaster, George Cochran.
 Chaplain, Charles A. Davis.
 Marine Second Lieutenant, L. E. Fagan.
 Acting Masters, W. U. Grozier, S. J. White.
 Acting Ensigns, George T. Davis, Whitman Chase, E. A. Small, Joseph F. Brown.

Notable crew
 Samuel Barron, Captain 1858, United States, and later Confederate naval officer, Confederacy representative to Europe.
 George Dewey, Midshipman 1858, future Admiral of the Navy and Presidential candidate 1900.
 Samuel Francis Du Pont, flag officer 1861–1862
 Frederick K. Engle, Captain 1856,
 Oscar Walter Farenholt, Ordinary Seaman 1861, first enlisted man in the Navy to reach flag rank
 Samuel Mercer, Captain 1861,
 Edward D. Robie, Naval engineer 1871, inventor, Union naval officer during the American Civil War and future Rear Admiral.
 Christopher Raymond Perry Rodgers, Captain 1861, Superintendent of the United States Naval Academy, and Commander-in-Chief of the Pacific Squadron.
 Melancton Smith, Captain 1865, Commander during the Siege of Fort Fisher.
 John Henry Upshur, Executive officer 1862 during the Battle of Port Royal, Port Royal, South Carolina.

Honored Crew
 Albert Burton, Seaman 1865, Medal of Honor recipient from New York City
 Edward Ringold, Coxswain 1862, Medal of Honor recipient from Baltimore, Maryland
 Louis C. Shepard, Ordinary Seaman 1865, Medal of Honor recipient from Ashtabula County, buried in Lakeview cemetery, Port Clinton, Ottawa County, Ohio.
 Andrew J. Tomlin, Corporal 1865, Medal of Honor recipient from Goshen, New Jersey, buried in Goshen Methodist cemetery, Goshen, New Jersey.

Post–Civil War service, 1866–1912Wabash was placed in ordinary from 1866 to 1869; overhauled during 1870 to 1871; and recommissioned on October 24, 1871, Captain Robert W. Shufeldt commanding. Wabash departed the Boston Navy Yard on November 17, 1871 and served as the flagship of Rear Admiral James Alden, commanding the Mediterranean Squadron. She arrived at Cadiz, Spain, on December 14, 1871 and cruised throughout the Mediterranean until November 30, 1873 when she departed Gibraltar, bound for Key West, Florida. Wabash arrived in Key West on January 3, 1874. She was decommissioned on April 25, 1874 at the Boston Navy Yard. In 1875, she was placed in ordinary and served as a housed-over receiving ship from 1876 to 1912. Wabash was struck from the Navy list on November 15, 1912 and sold that same day to the Boston Iron and Metal Company, Boston, Massachusetts. The following year, she was burned to facilitate salvage of her metal parts.

Surviving guns
Five IX-inch Dahlgren smooth-bore cannon which served on the Wabash survived at the Boston Navy Yard. They were transferred in 2010 to the National Civil War Naval Museum in Columbus, Georgia, where they are on display. Four of the guns are Tredegar Iron Works pieces. One is registry #45, one is either #50 or 51, one is probably #34, and the number of the fourth is unknown. All were cast in 1855. The fifth Dahlgren gun was cast by Cyrus Alger & Co., Boston, Massachusetts, in 1864, registry # 852.

Additionally, a 6.4-inch (100-pounder) Parrott rifle which served on the Wabash survives in Danvers, Massachusetts. It is a West Point Foundry foundry piece, registry #116, cast in 1863.

See also

 List of steam frigates of the United States Navy
 Union Navy
 Battle of Fort Pulaski

References
 
 Porter, David D. The Naval History of the Civil War Castle, Secaucus, NJ, 1984, .
 Silverstone, Paul H. Warships of the Civil War Navies'' Naval Institute Press, Annapolis, MD, 1989, .

External links
 The Steam Frigate USS Wabash
 Pictures of USS Wabash
 Letter from Henry Goulton on board USS Wabash to his mother – 25 January 1859
 USS Wabash (1856–1912)
 Admiral DuPont and staff Deck of U.S.S. Wabash.
 USS Wabash Musicians
 Deck of the USS Wabash
 USS Wabash After pivot gun. X in. Dahlgren
 USS Wabash Forward pivot gun Officers and sailors
 USS Wabash Forward pivot gun. 200 pdr Parrott
 U.S.S. Wabash Horizontal Steeple Engines
 U.S.S. Wabash Horizontal Steeple Engines
 The Egotistigraphy, by John Sanford Barnes. An autobiography, including his Civil War Union Navy service on USS Wabash, privately printed 1910. Internet edition edited by Susan Bainbridge Hay 2012
 Letterbook of the U.S.S. Wabash, 1857, MS 158 held by Special Collections & Archives, Nimitz Library at the United States Naval Academy

Ships of the Union Navy
Ships built in Philadelphia
Gunboats of the United States Navy
Steamships of the United States Navy
Sailing frigates of the United States Navy
American Civil War patrol vessels of the United States
1855 ships
Maritime incidents in April 1859